Romain Ntamack (born 1 May 1999) is a French rugby union fly-half who currently plays for Toulouse in the Top 14, and the France national rugby union team.

International career
In November 2017, Ntamack was selected for the French Barbarian team which played and beat the Māori All Blacks 19–15. He made his senior international test debut for France in a Six Nations game against Wales, on 1 February 2019 and got this date in Roman numerals tattooed on his left forearm. He was awarded the World Rugby Breakthrough Player of the Year in 2019. He was named Man of the Match in the Six Nations game against Wales on 22 February 2020.

International tries

Personal life
Ntamack is the son of former French rugby union international Émile Ntamack and Marie Séguéla (formerly Ntamack - his parents are separated) who met whilst both studying sport science at university. 
He has a younger brother Théo also playing for Stade Toulousain and France youth teams, as a forward. They both started playing for Stade Toulousain youth teams when they were five years of age and have never known any other club. They have never been in a team formally coached by their father. 

Ntamack is of Cameroonian descent through his paternal grandfather and Pied-Noir descent through his paternal grandmother. 
His maternal grandfather Jean-Claude Seguela was flyhalf and occasional fullback for SCA Pamiers, Laurent Spanghero and Yoann Huget's former club.

Honours

International 
 France (U20)
Six Nations Under 20s Championship: 2018
World Rugby Under 20 Championship: 2018

 France
Six Nations Championship: 2022
Grand Slam: 2022

Club 
 Toulouse
Top 14: 2018–19, 2020–21
European Rugby Champions Cup: 2020–2021

References

External links
France profile at FFR
Toulouse profile
L'Équipe profile

1999 births
Living people
Rugby union players from Toulouse
French rugby union players
Stade Toulousain players
Rugby union fly-halves
French sportspeople of Cameroonian descent
France international rugby union players